Club Athlétique Bizertin or CAB is a football club from Bizerte in Tunisia. It was founded on June 20, 1928.
CA Bizertin have won the Tunisian League four times, the Tunisian Cup three times, the Tunisian League Cup once and became the first Tunisian club to win an African trophy the CAF Cup Winners' Cup in 1988.

Achievements

Performance in national & domestic competitions
 Tunisian League: 4
Winners : 1944¹, 1945¹, 1948¹, 1984
 Tunisian President Cup: 3
Winners : 1982, 1987, 2013
 Tunisian League Cup: 1
Winners : 2004
 Tunisian Super Cup: 1
Winners : 1984

¹titles won prior to independence

Performance in CAF Competitions
CAF Champions League / African Cup of Champions Clubs: 2 appearances
1985 – Second Round
2013 – Second Round

CAF Cup: 2 appearances
1992 – Semi-finals
2000 – Second Round

CAF Confederation Cup: 2 appearances
2013 – Semi-finals
2014 – Second Round

CAF Cup Winners' Cup: 2 appearances
1988 – Champion
1989 – Second Round

Colours & badges
CA Bizertin supporters help is needed to develop this section.

Club badges

Players

First-team squad

Out on loan

Club Officials

Board of directors

Current technical staff

Presidents

Notable coaches

References

External links
 www.sofascore.com

Football clubs in Tunisia
Association football clubs established in 1928
 
1928 establishments in Tunisia
Sports clubs in Tunisia
African Cup Winners Cup winning clubs